Mez or MEZ may refer to:

 Mez Breeze, Australian artist
Mez, American rapper
 Carl Christian Mez (1866–1944), German botanist
 Maz (Romanized: Mez), a village in Fars Province, Iran
 Mactan Enerzone Corporation
 Maritime Exclusion Zone, a military exclusion zone at sea
 Mena Intermountain Municipal Airport (FAA LID: MEZ), an airport in Mena, Arkansas
 Menominee language (ISO 639-3: mez), a language spoken by the Menominee people
  (MEZ), or Middle European Time (MET), equivalent to Central European Time (CET)

See also
 Metz (disambiguation)